Life Is Music is the third studio album recorded by American female vocal trio The Ritchie Family, released in 1977 on the Marlin label.

History
The album features the title track, which peaked at No. 8 on the Hot Dance/Disco chart along with songs "Lady Luck" and "Disco Blues". "Life Is Music" also peaked at No. 74 on the Hot Soul Singles chart.

Track listing

Personnel
Cheryl Mason Jacks, Cassandra Ann Wooten, Gwendolyn Oliver – vocals
Richie Rome – electric piano, acoustic piano
Charles Collins – drums
Bobby Eli, Craig Snyder, Dennis Harris – guitars
Larry Washington, – congas
Don Renaldo – strings, horns
Jose Hermeto Michelena Do Santos – maracas
David "Tambourine" Campbell – tambourine
Michael "Sugar Bear" Foreman – bass
Buddy Turner, Johnny Belmon, Jerry Atkins, Victor Drayton – male vocals

Production
Jacques Morali, Richie Rome – producers, arrangers
Henri Belolo – general supervisor
Ken Present – engineer
Darrell Rogers, Jeff Stewart, Dirk Devlin, Carla Bandini – assistant engineers
Rodolphe Haussaire – photographer

Charts

Singles

References

External links
 

1977 albums
The Ritchie Family albums
Albums produced by Jacques Morali
Albums recorded at Sigma Sound Studios
Marlin Records albums